Colonel Jesus Villamor Air Base, known simply as Villamor Air Base , is the headquarters of the Philippine Air Force (PAF) and shares runways with Ninoy Aquino International Airport (NAIA). It was formerly known as Nichols Field or Nichols Air Base. Chiefly used as a PAF transport/helicopter airbase, the Maharlika Hall located at the base is used by the president of the Philippines when departing for foreign or domestic trips. Also, foreign dignitaries visiting Manila would usually arrive at the air base.

The base is named after Filipino World War II pilot Jesús A. Villamor.

History
Nichols Field was built in 1919 by the United States during the insular government and in 1941 was used as an airfield by the United States Army Air Forces in the South West Pacific Theatre. The field was the location of the U.S. Far East Air Force's U.S. 20th Air Base Group. Also, based at the field was Troop F of the U.S. 26th Cavalry Regiment.

A Fifth Air Force base, Nichols Field was within the territory of the Japanese occupation of the Philippines, December 1941 – January 1945.

Nichols Air Base
Designated Nichols Air Base after Philippine independence, in 1997, the base was reduced to make way for construction of NAIA Terminal 3 and Newport City.

In 2007, a Skyway exit to both the air base and NAIA Terminal 3 was completed.

In 2010, the AVSECOM van (called by some as "Ninoy Aquino's death van") which had carried the body of Ninoy Aquino to the hospital after his assassination in 1983 was found rotting inside Nichols Air Base (now called Villamor Airbase). This was reported only two years later by ABS-CBN News. Photos of this "death van" were subsequently posted on the blog site of the Filipino investigative journalist, Raissa Robles, who reported the discovery.

Gallery

References

Military facilities in Metro Manila
Air force installations of the Philippines
Buildings and structures in Pasay